Antonio Viana Gomes, better known as Tony Tornado or Toni Tornado (Mirante do Paranapanema, May 26, 1930), is a Brazilian actor and singer. In 1970 he won the Brazilian stage of the V International Song Festival with the soul song "BR-3".

Biography

Son of  a Guyanese father and a Brazilian mother, at 11 years old Tony ran away from home and ended up in Rio de Janeiro where he became a street kid and made a living selling peanuts and shining shoes.

At 18 he served in the Deodoro School of Parachuting along with the future TV presenter and entrepreneur Silvio Santos. In 1957, he fought in the Suez Canal.

Tony began his artistic career in the 60s with the stage name Tony Checker, lip-synching and dancing on "Hoje é dia de Rock"  show of Jair Taumaturgo. That time Tony imitated singers Chubby Checker and Little Richard. Even in the 60s, he traveled to the United States where he lived for five years in New York.

In New York, Tony served as drug dealer and pimp, to deceive the immigration department, pretending to be an employee of a car wash. At that time, Tony met another Brazilian who also lived in New York, the also singer Tim Maia.

Back in Brazil in 1969, he worked in the group of Ed Lincoln and also sang at night with the pseudonym Johnny Bradfort, the owner of the club forced him to pretend to be a foreigner.

In 1970, he adopted the name with he came to be known, "Tony Tornado". Influenced by James Brown, Tony was one of the artists who introduced soul music and funk in Brazilian music.

That same year, alongside Trio Ternura defended the song BR-3, which got the first place in the festival. His first role  on television  was in 1972, in the  1972 telenovela "Jerônimo" on TV Tupi.

Tornado often participates in several soap operas and miniseries, although almost never in prominent roles. The biggest role of his career on TV was Gregório Fortunato, the "Black Angel", the chief of the security of the president and statesman Getúlio Vargas in the 1993 miniseries Agosto, based on the work of Rubem Fonseca. Another important role of his career was the foreman Rodésio, who worked for Viúva Porcina (Regina Duarte) in Roque Santeiro.

Tornado was married to actress Arlete Salles in the 70's. He is father of the also actor and  singer Lincoln Tornado

Currently, Tornado returned to performing on stages all over Brazil singing his greatest hits, accompanied by the band Funkessência and Lincoln Tornado.

References

Living people
1930 births
Afro-Brazilian male singers
Brazilian male film actors
Brazilian male telenovela actors
Brazilian male stage actors
Brazilian people of Guyanese descent
Brazilian funk singers
Brazilian soul singers